Den blå hund is the eleventh album released 1984 by the Danish rock band Gnags.

Track listing 
All songs written and arranged by Gnags.
 Går med hunden gennem byen — 3:16
 Vilde kaniner — 4:11
 Blå time — 3:21
 Blue — 4:44
 Lørdag aften — 3:33
 Zigurrat — 4:28
 Plastik fra læder — 4:23
 Endnu et efterår — 3:37
 Gonat nu — 3:10
 Pigen og sømanden — 4:05

Personnel

Gnags
Peter A.G. Nielsen: Vocals, guitars, keyboards
Jacob Riis-Olsen: Guitars, keyboards
Per Chr. Frost: Guitars, keyboards, bass, backing vocals
Ivan Sørensen: Keyboards, guitars
Jens J. Nielson: Drums, percussion, backing vocals
Mads Michelsen: Drums, steel drums, additional percussion

Additional Personnel
Elisabeth G. Nielsen, Lis Sørensen: Backing vocals

1984 albums
Gnags albums